In molecular biology, the term intrinsic pathway may refer to multiple cascades of protein interactions.

 The intrinsic pathway of apoptosis refers to cell death initiated by changes in mitochondria, also known as the mitochondrial pathway or intracellular pathway or intrinsic apoptosis.
 The intrinsic pathway of blood coagulation is also known as the contact activation pathway and refers to a cascade of enzymatic reactions resulting in blood clotting.